1973 Masters may refer to:
1973 Masters Tournament, golf
1973 Commercial Union Assurance Masters, tennis